Voyady (Woyaźı) is a rural locality (a selo) and the administrative centre of Voyadinsky Selsoviet, Yanaulsky District, Bashkortostan, Russia. The population was 395 as of 2010. There are 5 streets.

Geography 
Voyady is located 29 km northwest of Yanaul (the district's administrative centre) by road. Changakul is the nearest rural locality.

References 

Rural localities in Yanaulsky District